Samson Siasia (born 14 August 1967) is a Nigerian former professional football striker and the former head coach of the Nigeria national team from 2010 to October 2011. He was reappointed in 2016.

On 16 August 2019, FIFA banned Siasia from all football activities for life (later reduced to five years), following a match-fixing investigation. The adjudicatory chamber of FIFA’s independent Ethics Committee alleged that the former Nigerian coach is guilty of "bribes in relation to the manipulation of matches in violation of the FIFA Code of Ethics".

Playing career

Club
At club level, Siasia most notably played for French team FC Nantes where he became league champion in 1994–95. He also played for Australian club Perth Glory with fellow Nigerian Peter Anosike, as well as in Belgium, Portugal, Saudi Arabia and Israel.

International
He played 51 international matches for Nigeria, in which he scored thirteen goals, and was part of the team that participated in the 1994 FIFA World Cup and won the 1994 African Nations Cup. He was also a member of the Nigerian team that won bronze at 1992 African Nations Cup in Senegal. He participated in the national team over a period of 11 years and was recognized in Nigeria as the third leading scorer for the national team.

Honours
In November 2009, the main field at the Yenagoa Township Stadium was named in his honor.

Coaching career
In 2005, Samson Siasia coached the under 20 team (Flying Eagles), taking them to the finals of both the  2005 Under-20 World Cup and the U-20 African Youth Championship. He won the African Youth Championship and  advanced all the way to the world final – before losing to Argentina 2–1.  He also assisted Augustine Eguavoen in coaching the national team.

Samson Siasia was appointed national U-23 coach in January 2007. In 2008, he coached the Nigerian Under-23 Olympic squad to the final against Argentina.  In a superbly played series of matches, Nigeria's team earned the Olympic Silver Medals.  Earlier in 2008, the U-23 team won the inaugural Intercontinental Cup in Malaysia.  This team was composed entirely of domestic Nigerian players and won the Cup against many teams headed for the 2008 Summer Olympics. In addition to his position as head coach of the  Under 23 Olympic Eagles, he developed a youth academy in the capital city Abuja, called SiaOne Soccer Academy. On 17 March 2009, he was reappointed as the head coach of the under-20 team after the finished a disappointing 3rd in the 2009 African Youth Championship. He received a six-month contract to coach Heartland F.C. in July 2010.  On 4 November 2010, he was named as the national team coach to succeed Swedish Lars Lagerbäck. He was fired on 28 October 2011 for failing to take the Nigeria team to the 2012 African Nations Cup in Gabon & Equatorial Guinea.

Siasia was one of the five foreign managers auctioned in February 2012 for the new Bengal Premier League Soccer. His former national teammate, Jay-Jay Okocha, was bought by the same club from the five icon players up for auction. On 26 February 2016, he was named by the Nigeria Football Federation (NFF) as the Chief Coach of the Nigeria national team, the Super Eagles, to be assisted by Salisu Yusuf, Emmanuel Amunike and Alloysius Agu after the resignation of Sunday Oliseh from the position.

He returned to the U-23 post in 2015 and led Nigeria to the Rio Olympics.
In February 2017 he was one of a number of managers on the shortlist for the vacant Rwanda national team manager role.

In April 2018 he was one of 77 applicants for the vacant Cameroon national team job.

Corruption allegation 
In August 2019 he was handed a lifetime ban by FIFA related to match fixing. He said he would appeal but was in no rush to do so. In June 2021, Siasia's appeal at the Court of Arbitration for Sport earned him a reduction of the suspension to five years and the cancellation of the additional fine of 50,000 Swiss francs ($54,000).

References

External links
Official Web Site of Samson Siasia at SiaOne.com
Official Web Site of SiaOne Soccer Academy at SiaOne.com

1967 births
Living people
Sportspeople from Lagos
Nigerian footballers
Nigeria under-20 international footballers
Nigeria international footballers
Nigerian expatriate footballers
Africa Cup of Nations-winning players
1992 African Cup of Nations players
1994 African Cup of Nations players
1994 FIFA World Cup players
1995 King Fahd Cup players
Footballers at the 1988 Summer Olympics
Olympic footballers of Nigeria
Nigerian football managers
K.S.C. Lokeren Oost-Vlaanderen players
FC Nantes players
Al Hilal SFC players
Perth Glory FC players
Hapoel Tzafririm Holon F.C. players
Belgian Pro League players
El-Kanemi Warriors F.C. players
Ligue 1 players
Liga Leumit players
Primeira Liga players
Expatriate footballers in Belgium
Expatriate footballers in France
Expatriate footballers in Portugal
Expatriate footballers in Saudi Arabia
Expatriate soccer players in Australia
Expatriate footballers in Israel
National Soccer League (Australia) players
Nigerian expatriate sportspeople in Australia
Nigerian expatriate sportspeople in Belgium
Nigerian expatriate sportspeople in France
Nigerian expatriate sportspeople in Portugal
Nigerian expatriate sportspeople in Saudi Arabia
Nigerian expatriate sportspeople in Israel
Association football forwards
Saudi Professional League players
Olympic silver medalists for Nigeria
Bendel United F.C. players
Match fixers
Sportspeople banned for life